Rob Potylo (born Louis Robert Potylo; September 3, 1976) is an artist, film producer, and musical comedian.
He has produced and appeared in five seasons of Quiet Desperation, a scripted online mockumentary comedy web show and cable series about the underground art and music scene.

He is also known for performing as Robby Roadsteamer, a fictional comedic persona portrayed on WBCN 104.1 FM radio in Boston for several years. The character, inspired in part by rock musicians and professional wrestling stars, would spawn the release of multiple albums and a live touring band, as well as various other miscellaneous media ventures.

Career
In September 2007, Potylo appeared in an episode of a reality dating show "Sox Appeal", which was broadcast on New England Sports Network (NESN). The dating show took place on the right field roof deck during a Red Sox game at Fenway Park, and saw Potylo predict a David Ortiz double during the broadcast.

At the 2009 Andy Kaufman Awards at Caroline's Comedy club in New York City, Potylo came in 2nd place at the competition. Judged by Andy Kaufman's father, his brother Michael, and Kristen Schaal

In February 2011, Potylo teamed up with Jennifer Coolidge to sing "Happy Birthday" to Jennifer's dad at the Wilbur Theatre. She also appeared in his reality series Quiet Desperation.

In 2012, Potylo collaborated with performance artists and anarchist presidential candidate Vermin Supreme. He was featured as Supreme's protege in the 2014 documentary "Who Is Vermin Supreme? An Outsider Odyssey."

In April 2014, Potylo returned to live radio with The Rob Potylo Entertainment System, a daily hot talk show produced by Rob Kaufman, for the Cambridge based independent podcast studio, WEMF Radio. The weekday afternoon drive program featured introspective monologues, alternative improvisational comedy segments, and appearances by local performing musicians.

In December 2014, Robby Roadsteamer returned from hiatus at The Middle East Downstairs in Cambridge, MA, resurfacing with his new "manager" WWE's The "Mouth of the South" Jimmy Hart. The two then co-created a new mockumentary series "Loud Satisfaction".

Potylo appeared on Season 1, Episode 4 of The Gong Show to perform his song "Hot Dogs And Applesauce," and encored with "Shaving Cream" by Benny Belle. He is the only contestant in the show's history to receive a SAG performer's credit through the show.

Potylo appeared on Ellen (TV series) on Season 15 episode 38 the IT Haunted House at Warner Bros Studio lot in a segment with producer Andy Lassner.

Personal life

He is the son of Louis and Patricia Potylo of Danvers, Massachusetts.

Potylo frequently collaborated with close friend and housemate Chyna up until her death in April 2016. He served as executive producer of the documentary about her life and professional wrestling career. After her death, Potylo was given administrator access to her social media pages, and his two year campaign led to her WWE Hall of Fame induction in 2019.

References

External links
 Quiet Desperation
 Who is Vermin Supreme
 Interview With Rob Potylo

1976 births
Date of birth missing (living people)
Living people
American comedy musicians
Musicians from Boston
American people of Polish descent
21st-century American comedians